Suspicious Package is the second full-length album by the blues rock band Earl Greyhound. It was released in April 2010 by the band's own label, Hawk Race Records. The album marks a departure from the band's previous album, Soft Targets, by mixing that album's blues rock sounds with additional genre influences, while increasing the contributions of bassist/keyboardist/singer Kamara Thomas and drummer Ricc Sheridan.

Track listing

Personnel
Matt Whyte (guitar, vocals)
Kamara Thomas (bass, keyboards, vocals)
Ricc Sheridan (drums)

References

Earl Greyhound albums
2010 albums